The 1940 Michigan gubernatorial election was held on November 5, 1940. Democratic nominee Murray Van Wagoner defeated incumbent Republican Luren Dickinson with 53.06% of the vote.

General election

Candidates
Major party candidates
Murray Van Wagoner, Democratic
Luren Dickinson, Republican
Other candidates
Seth Whitmore, Socialist
Philip Raymond, Communist
Ralph Naylor, Socialist Labor

Results

Primaries
The primary elections occurred on September 10, 1940.

Democratic Primary

Republican Primary

References

1940
Michigan
Gubernatorial
November 1940 events